Ryan Woods may refer to:

 Ryan Woods (footballer, born 1988), English footballer for Carshalton Athletic
 Ryan Woods (footballer, born 1993), English footballer for Hull City